Jake Jacob Grey (17 February 1984 – 19 December 2021) was a Samoan rugby union prop who played for SCOPA and the Samoa national rugby union team.

Grey made his debut for Samoa in 2014 in Samoa's 4 Test series and was part of the squad at the 2015 Rugby World Cup.

He spent some time in Ireland after arriving in 2006 and departed in 2012 with hopes of representing Samoa.

Grey died on 19 December 2021, at the age of 37, after suffering from cancer.

References

External links
ESPN Profile

1984 births
2021 deaths
Samoa international rugby union players
Rugby union props